Robo Force was a toy line created by the Ideal Toy Company in the year 1984. The line was revived in 2013 by new rights holder Toyfinity. The line was sold from Toyfinity to The Nacelle Company in 2021.

Characters

ROBO Force
 Maxx Steele: The Leader/Maxx Zero - Maxx Steele is one of the toughest robots and almost invulnerable. Armed with a pair of laser hand weapons stored in his backpack and a back-mounted, swiveling, double-barreled attack gun, he is hard to beat when against Hun-Dred's army of evil robots. His motto "Any mission, any time, any place" shows his team that he is determined to win the fight against Hun-Dred no matter what stands in his way. He was renamed Maxx Zero when the toy line was revived. 
 Blazer: The Ignitor - Very powerful and very crazy is what describes Blazer. His weapons are not only unique but his way of using them are amazing. On both of his arms, he has nozzles that can shoot out boiling hot plasma which can melt the hardest of steel and on his head is a cryogenic water cannon that can extinguish the flames he creates so his fire doesn't burn and destroy everything in sight.
 Coptor: The Enforcer - Speed and agility are qualities that Coptor never lacks! He is the team’s acrobat always zooming by using the propeller on his head. Weapons he carries are two laser guns and a communicator that can contact Max Steele or any of the other robots from anyplace far away. Digging is even possible with the aid of his propeller.  Coptor is the oldest of the good robots and was built by Dr. Fury.
 Sentinel: The Protector - Sentinel is always ready to hop into combat. With a permanent laser gun in his head that he can use anytime, he never runs out of weapons. He also stores two other weapons in his backpack just in case the battle gets tough. Putting the Command Patroller through moves no one had ever seen before he was made the team driver.
 Wrecker: The Demolisher - Wrecker is a construction worker in his civilian life but in Maxx Steele's army he is the team's demolitionist. A fortress would easily crumble if Wrecker was sent to destroy it. His weapons are an atomic jackhammer and a laser drill. He also stores a metal-alloy wrecking hook.
 S.O.T.A.: The Creator - S.O.T.A is a professor when he's not on Robo Force missions. But when he is serving Max Steele he is a calm and always in control senior councilor. His name stands for State of the art which gives a clue about his superior intellect. He has an information-collection dish on his backpack which gives him radar, sonar, and extended hearing along with infra-red, microscopic, and telescopic vision. He also carries a drill which can be used for crafting and battle while an accurate laser targeting weapon is stored in his head.
 Vanguard: The Protector - A new member of Robo Force introduced 2015, Vanguard is the brother of Sentinel. He can combine with Maxx Zero to form Dreadnought Maxx Zero.

Cult of Dred
 Hun-Dred: The Conqueror - The worst enemy that threatens Maxx Steele's team, Hun-Dred leads the evil robot empire. His weapons include laser guns, crushers instead of hands, twin hand-held attack weapons, and laser shooters that he uses for artillery. He also has the ability to sense fear in any being and destroys anyone or anything that stands in his way.
 Enemy: The Dictator - A terrible and vicious robot enemy would destroy anything that got in his way as long as Robo Force falls. If Hun-Dred orders him to not attack he does. If Hun-Dred orders him to destroy one robot he destroys the whole planet. His weapons are a retro-fire gun that he mounts on his backpack and twin laser weapons that are stored in his chest.
 Cruel: The Detonator - An expert in combat Cruel uses his terrifying crushing grapplers to destroy any robot he meets. He is silent and indestructible which makes it easy for him to commit heinous acts. He also has two communication antennae on the upper sides of his head which allow him to communicate to others over long distances.
 Vulgar: The Destroyer - Vulgar is charged with evil dark forces that make up his body and puts his sinister abilities to use. His amazing strength was made from a mixture of science and wickedness. He is a gray, black, and red being with a large rotating head and villainous-looking eyes. He wields many weapons including a drill bit located permanently in the back of his head which is sharp and dangerous to Max Steele's army of good robots. Vulgar also carries a deadly loaded mace blaster that he can hit targets with amazing accuracy.
 Nazgar: The Tyrant - Nazgar was an evil dictator that conquered the planet Zeton 2,000 years prior.  His brain was preserved by the Cult of Dred.  Hun-Dred kidnaps Dr. Fury, an expert in cyborg technology, to construct a robotic body for Nazgar.
 Battlestar: The Guardian - A new member of the Cult of Dred introduced in 2014. The guardian of Celestia, he protects Nazgar and Hun-Dred from the Robo Force!

Toys

Ideal Toy Company
The original toy line featured robot action figures with suction cup bases and "crusher arm" action.  In addition, each figure, which basically resembled a customized Dalek, also included another gimmick or two such as a hook or extendable guns. Besides action figures, there was also an Electronic Maxx Steele Programmable Robot and a Maxx Steele Erector Set released.

Figures
Robo Force
 Maxx Steele - The Leader
 Blazer - The Ignitor
 Coptor - The Enforcer
 Sentinel - The Protector
 Wrecker - The Demolisher
 S.O.T.A. - The Creator
Cult of Dred
 Hun-Dred - The Conqueror
 Enemy - The Dictator
 Cruel - The Detonator
 Vulgar - The Destroyer

Vehicles and playsets
 Robocruiser Robot Defender Vehicle
 Dred Crawler Robot Attack Vehicle
 Command Patroller
 Fortress of Steele playset

Unreleased
While the figures were developed up to the product catalog photo stage, they were not released before the original line came to an end. A few early production Tiltor sample figures have pop up over the years and gotten into the hands of collectors.

Robo Force
 Tiltor - The Changer
 Opticon - The Interceptor
 Ripper - The Anti-Robot
 Mark Fury
 Deena Strong
Cult of Dred
 Plundor - The Pulverizer
 Fangar - The Conspirator
 Arsenal - The Devastator
 Nazgar - The Tyrant
Vehicles
 Triad Three-Way Attack Vehicle
 Transblaster Laser Lift Cannon.

Toyfinity
The rights to Robo Force (until 2021) - along with former Ideal lines Rocks & Bugs & Things, Zeroids, and Manglor - are held by production company Toyfinity. The Robo Force line specifically was sold to Nacelle in 2021 while the other former Ideal lines were retained by Toyfinity. Compatible with the Glyos System Series designed by Onell Design, the Robo Force kits feature 41 or more pieces a figure which can be arranged and re-arranged in any way the user sees fit. The new line was launched at New York Comic Con with a limited run Maxx Zero: Genesis Edition figure. Some figures receive more than one edition to go along with the developing story line featured in the new Robo Force comic book. By 2018 two additional Robo Force kits had been introduced offering additional parts to create Zeroids and more members of the original Robo Force line-up.

Toyfinity figures
In original Toyfinity Robo Force mold was released in 2013 as Maxx Zero Genesis Edition. It contained 41 parts inspired by Enemy, Hun-Dred, Maxx Zero and Sentinel. It could be assembled in a variety of configurations which included articulated legs and tank treads. Paint and additional parts were used to create numerous other characters.

A completely new Robo Force mold was released in 2018 as Zetonian Proto Enforcer. Made up of 26 parts inspired by Coptor and S.O.T.A. among others. This design featured a round body and a suction-cup-like base.

Robo Force
 Maxx Zero: The Leader
 Genesis Edition - Dark grey with minimal black paint applications. Released at NYCC 2013.
 Glyaxia Disguise - Yellow and extra blue parts with blue and black paint applications. Can also be used to make Protector-Class Glyaxia Drones and Elite Drones. Cost $20 each. Limited to 5 per customer. Released online July 18, 2014.
 Blank Edition - Light grey with no paint for customization. Offered for pre-order October 12-25th, 2014.
 Classic Edition - Light grey with paint details to match the vintage toy. Offered for pre-order October 12-25th, 2014.
 Ultimate Edition - Light grey with line details and over 100 paint applications. Offered for pre-order October 12-25th, 2014.
 Imperious Edition - Gold with line details and multiple paint applications. Club Zeton exclusive offered February 2015 to members.
 Stealth Special Edition - Colorless clear with 4 additional painted bonus pieces. Released online December 28, 2016.
 Zeroid Edition - Grey with paint applications and new tampos. Combine with Zeroids' Zintar to make Super Zeroid. Released online August 20, 2017.
 Zobor Edition - Metallic copper with paint applications and tampos. Combine with Zeroids' Zobor to make Super Zeroid Zobor. $25 each. Released online January 17, 2018.
 Metallic Copper Blank - $14 each. Released online January 17, 2018.
 Destroyer Edition - Classic deep blue with paint applications and tampos. Combines with Zeroids' Zerak to make Super Destroyer. Released online May 13, 2018.
 Solar Star Team Edition - Hunter orange with paint applications and tampos. Released online August 16, 2018.
 Original Edition - Light grey with paint details to match the vintage toy. Released online May 10, 2019.
 F.L.A.S.H. Edition - Army Green with paint applications and tampos. Released online February 19, 2021.
 Final Edition - Light grey with paint details to match the vintage toy. Offered for pre-order June 27, 2021. Produced with permission from Nacelle.
 Sentinel: The Protector
 Hunter Edition - Silver with black and white paint applications. $16 each. Released online March 23, 2014.
 Blank Edition - White with no paint for customization. Released online September 25, 2016.
 Classic Edition - White with paint details to match the vintage toy. Released online September 25, 2016.
 Wrecker: The Demolisher
 Deluxe Genesis Edition - Glow-in-the-dark with teal and white paint applications. Released online March 23, 2014.
 Vanguard: The Protector
 Dynagenesis Origin - A new character who is Sentinel's brother. Vanguard was the result of three Glyaxia Protector drones being fused together into one robot. Can combine with Maxx Zero to form Dreadnaught Maxx Zero. Orange with over 20 paint applications. 4 per customer. $30 each. Released online July 18, 2014.
 S.O.T.A.: The Creator
 Zetonian Edition - Light blue with classic tampo and paint applications. Released online December 28, 2018.
 Coptor: The Enforcer
 Zetonian Edition - Dark blue with classic tampo and paint applications. Released online October 4, 2019.
 Blazer: The Ignitor
 Classic Edition - Grey with classic tampo and paint details to match the vintage toy.  Released online December 21, 2020.

Cult of Dred
 Enemy: The Dictator
 Origin Edition - Dark blue with extra light blue parts with over 50 paint applications. Can also make Acromaxx. Released online December 20, 2013.
 Hun-Dred: The Conqueror
 Reforged Edition - Red with over 50 paint applications. Released online December 20, 2013.
 Classic Edition - Black with paint details to match the vintage toy. Can also make Dred-Maxx. Released online August 20, 2017.
 Battlestar: The Guardian
 Forging Edition - Black with silver paint applications. $16.50 each. 5 per customer. Released online July 18, 2014.
 Fangar: The Conspirator
 Predanaut Edition - A 3D printed figure created as a collaboration between Toyfinity and Mecha Zone. Released online July 30, 2015.
 Cruel: The Detonator
 Blank Edition - Red with no paint for customization. Offered for pre-order August 26 - September 20, 2015.
 Basic Edition - Red with extra black parts and paint details to match the vintage toy. Offered for pre-order August 26 - September 20, 2015.
 Ultimate Edition - Red with extra black parts along with line details and paint applications to match other Ultimate editions. Offered for pre-order August 26 - September 20, 2015.
 Vulgar: The Destroyer
 Zetonian Edition - Dark red with classic tampo and paint applications. Released online December 21, 2020.
 Brutal: The Activator
 Blank Edition - Purple with no paint for customization. Offered for pre-order August 26 - September 20, 2015.
 Ultimate Edition - Purple with extra black parts along with line details and paint applications to match other Ultimate editions. Offered for pre-order August 26 - September 20, 2015.
 Nazgar: The Tyrant
 Super Zeroid Black and Technician Zeroid with secret Nazgar the Tyrant hidden mode - metallic black with red paint applications. Released online February 7, 2016.
 Regal Edition - The brain of Nazgar the Tyrant in gold to be combined with any Robo Force and Zeroids kits. $1 each. Released online May 13, 2018.
 Powered Up Edition - Black with paint details & tampos to match the vintage prototype toy. Released online May 10, 2019.
 Final Edition - Black with paint details to match the vintage toy. Offered for pre-order June 27, 2021. Produced with permission from Nacelle.
 Nazarran
 Metallic Black Edition - Horrible brain creatures of Nazgar in metallic black. Released online September 25, 2016.
 Metallic Red Edition - Horrible brain creatures of Nazgar in red black. Released online August 20, 2017.
 Grey Edition - Horrible brain creatures of Nazgar in grey black. Released online August 20, 2017.
 Stealth Edition - Horrible brain creatures of Nazgar in translucent clear. Released online August 20, 2017.
 Metallic Copper Edition - Horrible brain creatures of Nazgar in bronze. Released online January 17, 2018.
 Blue Edition - Horrible brain creatures of Nazgar in blue. $1 each. Released online May 13, 2018.
 Dred Trooper
 Cult of Hun-Dred Edition - Nazgar's loyal army of Callgrim-trained soldiers in red. Released online December 28, 2018.
 Zetonians
 Zetonian Dark - Rescued from the ruins of Andor, these warriors of death serve the will of Hun-Dred! Black with minimal red paint applications. Can combine with Nazgar to make Ultimate Nazgar. 26 parts. $18 each. Released online May 10, 2019.

Zetonians
Modern Zeroids-based mechanical beings from the lost outpost of Andor. New body features a circular design to mimic the suction cup look of the original line. A joint design between Toyfinity and Onell Design. 
Zetonian Proto Enforcer - White with minimal black paint applications. 26 pieces. $18 each. Released online July 6, 2018.

Robo Force: The Revenge of Nazgar
In 1984, Ruby-Spears Productions released an animated adaptation of the series in the form of a one-shot special called Robo Force: The Revenge of Nazgar. Michael Hack provided Voice Direction with Flint Dille writing and Ron Jones composing the music.

Synopsis
A scientist named Dr. Fury and his family are in his house with Coptor. Suddenly, the evil robots led by Hun-Dred blast their way into his house. Coptor fires on the evil robots, but is defeated. The scientist is abducted by the evil robots for his research on putting human brains into robots. Hun-Dred and his crew would like Dr. Fury to do this for the evil Nazgar, who created trouble for the scientist's planet nearly two-thousand years ago.

Ten years later, a repaired Coptor and Dr. Fury's son (Mark Fury) along with new robots like Maxx Steele created by Mark go on a mission to find his father.

The final battle occurs in Nazgar's headquarters. Nazgar (whose brain is now in a robot body) seemingly escapes, Hun-Dred and a laser gun meant to wreak havoc on the planet are destroyed by Maxx Steele and Dr. Fury is saved.

Cast
 Michael Bell - Cruel
 Rodger Bumpass - Mark Fury
 Arthur Burghardt - Nazgar, Sentinel
 Peter Cullen - Coptor, Vulgar
 Ron Feinberg - Hun-Dred
 David Mendenhall - Jason Fury
 Robert Ridgely - Councilman Frost
 Neil Ross - Blazer
 John Stephenson - Dr. Richard Fury
 B.J. Ward - Deena Strong
 Alan Young - S.O.T.A.

DVD release
The animated Robo Force adaptation was released by Warner Archive as a special feature for the volume 2 DVD release of Challenge of the GoBots on March 10, 2015. This is its first home video release.

The Nacelle Company ownership, upcoming animated television series
In 2021, The Nacelle Company  announced that would acquire the rights to the Robo Force toy line from Toyfinity and plans for the animated television series based on the toy line are in development, and in January 2023, it was given the straight-to-series order and on March 7, Nacelle announced that the upcoming Robo Force television series will be distributed by GRB Studios for both linear and streaming television.

References

External links
 Toyfinity.com - Official Robo Force Toy Producer
 x-entertainment.com's Robo Force article
 The Old Robots Web Site: Robo Force
 

1980s toys
Ideal Toy Company
Robot superheroes